Trichromia gaudialis is a moth in the family Erebidae. It was described by William Schaus in 1905. It is found in French Guiana and Trinidad.

Subspecies
Trichromia gaudialis gaudialis (French Guiana)
Trichromia gaudialis trinitatis (Rothschild, 1909) (Trinidad)

References

Moths described in 1905
gaudialis